Raqeeb is a 2007 Indian romantic thriller film directed by Anurag Singh, and produced by Raj Kanwar. The film stars Sharman Joshi, Jimmy Sheirgill, Rahul Khanna, Tanushree Dutta. It released on 18 May 2007. It is an unofficial remake of Goodbye Lover on which the 2008 film Race is also based.

Plot
Remo (Rahul Khanna) is a multi-millionaire simpleton. Thanks to his mischievous half-brother Siddarth (Sharman Joshi) who meets Sophie (Tanushree Dutta), he falls in love with her and marries her. Trouble starts when Sunny (Jimmy Sheirgill), Sophie's ex-boyfriend, enters the picture. Sunny and Sophie hatch a diabolical plan to kill Remo by natural means - threatening fake bullets, so that he dies in an asthmatic attack, and no suspicion is raised. Sunny fires his gun, and Remo gets killed as the bullets were real. Siddharth has set this up. 

It is revealed that Siddharth and Sophie are indeed in a relationship and working together by killing Remo, for taking revenge against his half brother and his father who had extramarital affair with another woman, causing Siddharth's mother to have a mental breakdown and sending her to mental asylum and now taking over his ownership money and framing Sunny for the murder. However all the money from Remo's bank account is removed and it is revealed that Remo is indeed alive, all he did was fake his own death to catch him, He along with Sunny and Inspector were all working together to catch him red handed. In the climax, Siddharth and Sophie meets Remo and the Inspector comes to arrest them. A fight starts between the men and fatally injuring Siddharth, while Sophie runs away and falls into an open grave, Remo looks at her and feels sorry for loving the wrong person. An enraged Siddharth comes from behind to stab Remo but Remo dodges the attack and accidentally stabs Sophie and himself falling into the grave, thus ending both of their life. In the end Remo meets his step mother in the mental asylum claiming he doesn't know her. While he gets into his car, he meets Sunny and thanks him from saving him for getting framed at murder and both men shake hands.

Cast 
 Rahul Khanna as Remo Matthews
 Jimmy Sheirgill as Sunny Anil Khanna
 Sharman Joshi as Siddharth Verma
 Tanushree Dutta as Sophie Matthews
 Vishwajeet Pradhan as CBI Officer Pradhan
 Vivek Shauq as Shri Mismatch Sharma (SMS)
 Sherlyn Chopra (Special appearance in an item number)

Soundtrack 

Raqeeb had 8 songs composed by Pritam and written by Sameer. The album received a poor review from Glamsham.

References

External links
 

2000s Hindi-language films
2007 films
Films featuring songs by Pritam
Films directed by Anurag Singh
Films about adultery in India